"It's Over Love" is song by American DJ and remixer Todd Terry featuring American singer Shannon, released on his 1997 album Ready for a New Day. It received positive reviews from music critics, topping the US Billboard Hot Dance Club Play chart in April 1998 and reaching number 16 in the UK, making it Terry's third highest charting single on the UK Singles Chart. It was also performed at the British music chart television programme Top of the Pops.

Critical reception
Larry Flick from Billboard wrote that Todd Terry "reminds club-land of his ability to construct catchy ditties that offer no apologies for their straightforward pop feel." He described the track as a "appealing single [...] bolstered by a seductively breathy vocal by disco-era diva Shannon", and also complimented its "pleasantly repetitive hook". British magazine Music Week gave the song four out of five, adding, "More classy, uplifting garage from Todd The God featuring big vocals by Shannon. Not as massive as "Somethin' Going On", but pretty large by any measure." Also Chris Finan from the RM Dance Update rated "It's Over Love" four out of five.

Track listing

Charts

Weekly charts

Year-end charts

References

1997 singles
1997 songs
American house music songs
House music songs
Logic Records singles
Shannon (singer) songs
Todd Terry songs